Renegade Swords II is an anthology of fantasy short stories in the sword and sorcery subgenre, edited by D. M. Ritzlin. It was first published in trade paperback and ebook by DMR Books in February 2021.

Summary
The book collects eight classic sword and sorcery short stories and novelettes, including Michael Moorcock's two tales of Rackhir the Red Archer and two stories of Fal the Reiver by Keith Taylor.

Contents
"The Roaming Forest" (from Cross Plains Universe: Texans Celebrate Robert E. Howard, 2006) (Michael Moorcock)
"To Rescue Tanelorn" (from Science Fantasy v. 19, no. 56, Dec. 1962) (Michael Moorcock)
"Marchers of Valhalla" (from Marchers of Valhalla, 1972) (Robert E. Howard)
"Killer" (from Midnight Sun no. 1, 1974) (David Drake and Karl Edward Wagner)
"The Unlawful Hunter" (from Weird Tales v. 50, no. 1, Spring 1988) (Keith Taylor)
"The Haunting of Mara" (from Weird Tales v. 50, no. 3, Fall 1988) (Keith Taylor)
"The Pool of the Stone God" (from The American Weekly, Sep. 23, 1923) (A. Merritt)
"Stoneskin" (from The Magazine of Fantasy & Science Fictionv. 66, no. 6, Jun. 1984) (John Morressy)

Notes

2021 anthologies
Fantasy anthologies
DMR Books books